Listed here are all  known games released for the PC-88.

List of games

References

External links
 – PC88 Games index

PC-88
PC-88